Dawn M. E. Bowdish, (born May 21, 1976) is a Canadian immunologist and currently a professor in the Department of Pathology and Molecular Medicine at McMaster University in Ontario, Canada. She is a Tier 2 Canada Research Chair in Aging & Immunity. She is known for several discoveries including the immunomodulatory properties of the antimicrobial peptide LL-37, how MARCO signalling complex recognizes Mycobacterium tuberculosis, age-associated inflammation and its effects on clearing pneumococcal pneumonia and how the aging gut microbiome drives age-associated inflammation.

Career and research

Training 
Bowdish was born and raised in Hamilton, Ontario, Canada in 1976. In 1999, she graduated from the University of Guelph with an Honours Bachelor of Science in microbiology. Bowdish was a graduate student and obtained her PhD from the University of British Columbia between 2000 – 2005. There, under the supervision of Robert E. W. Hancock, she discovered the immunomodulatory role of the host defence peptide LL-37. As a Canadian Institute of Health Research Post-Doctoral Fellow, Bowdish worked at the University of Oxford from 2005-2008 under the supervision of Siamon Gordon in the Department of Pathology. It was during this time that she discovered the role of MARCO (macrophage receptor with collagenous structure) in recognizing and eliciting an immune response against trehalose dimycolate, the main immunogenic component in the outer membrane of Mycobacterium tuberculosis

Career 
In 2009, she joined the Department of Pathology & Molecular Medicine at McMaster University and was promoted to associate professor in 2014. In 2019, she was promoted to tenure professor in the same department. The Bowdish lab focuses primarily on the effects of aging on the immune system, specifically macrophages.  Her lab has been able to elucidate a mechanistic explanation for how aging alters myeloid cells and how these cells increase susceptibility to pneumococcal pneumonia. In 2017, the Bowdish lab demonstrated that age-associated gut microbe dysbiosis in mice increases age-associated inflammation. Bowdish currently holds an h-index score of 38. Bowdish's published works have received much media attention and continue to contribute more information regarding the interplay between the immune system, the gut microbiota, susceptibility to infection and aging.

Personal life 
While attending post-secondary studies, Dawn was debating between a degree in Women's studies or Microbiology, but ultimately decided on Microbiology.  Bowdish promotes social media use and encourages scientists to use these platforms as networking tools, to enhance interactions with the lay public and to promote diversity and equality in the sciences.

Fellowships and awards

2003-2005, Canada Graduate Scholarship awarded by the Canadian Institute of Health Research
2005-2008, Post-doctoral Fellowship awarded by the Canadian Institutes of Health Research
2006, Cangene Gold Award
2006-2008, JMH Junior Research Fellowship awarded by Linacre College at the University of Oxford
2010, ASPIRE, Pfizer Young Investigator Award 
2011, G. Jeanette Thorbecke New Investigator Award, Society of Leukocyte Biology
2012, Ontario Lung Association-Pfizer Canada Research Award
2014-2019, Canada Research Chair in Aging & Immunity, Tier 2
2016-2017, Breathe New Life Award
2018-2022, University Scholar
2019, McMaster Student's Union (MSU) Community Engagement Award

Editorships
Editor, Immunity & Ageing Journal, 2019–present

Leadership
Board of Directors, Ontario Lung Association, June 2015 – 2019
Vice-chair, 2016 Gordon conference on Acute Respiratory Infections (Galveston, Texas)
co-Chair, 2018 Gordon conference on Acute Respiratory Infections (Ventura, California)

Select publications

References

External links
 Bowdish Lab - Macrophage Biology at McMaster University
 

Canada Research Chairs
Canadian immunologists
1976 births
Living people
21st-century Canadian biologists
21st-century Canadian women scientists
Academic staff of McMaster University
People from Hamilton, Ontario
Scientists from Ontario
University of Guelph alumni
University of British Columbia alumni
Alumni of the University of Oxford
Canadian women biologists
Women immunologists
Academic journal editors